Leonid Aleksandrovich Ustrugov (November 23, 1877, Moscow – February 15, 1938, Moscow) was a Russian railway engineer who served as the Minister of Railways in the White government of Admiral Alexander Kolchak during the Russian Civil War from 1918–1920. He later became a victim of Stalin's Great Purge.

Family
The identity of Ustrugov's parents is unknown. In 1891, he was given the surname of the daughter of major Vera Gavrilovna Ustrugova, who adopted him. His first marriage was to Elizabeth Stepanovna, with whom he had three daughters: Vera, Tatyana, and Elena. His second marriage was to Maria Ivanovna, who bore him two sons, Leonid and Nikolai (who died in the first winter of the siege of Leningrad).

Education
Ustrugov graduated from the Komissarovsky Technical School (1897) and the Saint Petersburg Institute of Railway Engineers (1902) with the title of engineer of communications and the rank of collegiate secretary.

Railway Engineer
Ustrugov had an extensive career in railway engineering. In 1902–1906, he worked as the manufacturer of the construction of the Moscow Ring Railway. On April 1, 1906 he was made Assistant Chief of the section of the Moscow–Kiev–Voronezh Railway. On June 23, 1906 he became controller of passenger trains at the Moscow–Passenger station. From September 16, 1906 he served as a reserve agent for the Moscow–Passenger station. From February 1, 1907 he was Assistant Head of the Northern Railway's technical movement. From January 1, 1909 – Auditor, from July 15, 1909 he was Senior Auditor of the Northern Railway Traffic Services. On January 8, 1911 he became Assistant Chief of the Service of the Samara–Zlatoust Railway. On April 15, 1913 he was appointed Head of the Omsk Railway Traffic Service, Deputy Head of the Omsk Railway. For impeccable mobilization work in 1914 he was awarded the Order of Saint Anna, 3rd class. On May 1, 1916 he was made Head of the Omsk Railway, and on November 1, 1916 he was made Assistant Head of the Railway Department of the Ministry of Railways of Russia. From February to October 1917, he served as Deputy Minister of Railways under the Provisional Government.

Activities during the Civil War
Ustrugov was active in the White movement during the Russian Civil War. On the night of January 25–26, 1918, at a secret meeting of the Siberian Regional Duma, he was elected in absentia and without his consent by the Minister of Railways in the center-left anti-Bolshevik government of Peter Derber. In April 1918, at a meeting of shareholders of the Chinese Eastern Railway (CER), he was elected a member of the provisional board of the CER, was a member of the so-called "Business Cabinet" headed by General Dmitry Horvat as Minister of Communications.

On November 4, 1918 Ustrugov was appointed Minister of Railways of the Provisional All-Russian Government, from November 18, 1918 – Russian Government, acting under the Supreme Governor Alexander Kolchak. On November 19, 1918 he was also appointed Deputy Chairman of the Council of Ministers. He was considered one of the most competent members of the government of Alexander Kolchak, but had little interest in political issues. In March 1919, in Vladivostok, he signed an agreement on the management of the Trans-Siberian Railway with allies from the International Committee, which was supposed to improve throughput, and increase and streamline the freight traffic of this railway. However, according to historians, a dual power arose between Ustrugov and the American engineer Stevens, which had a negative effect on the work of the highway.

In the autumn of 1919, Ustrugov acted as head of military communications of the rear as an assistant chief of staff of the Supreme Commander-in-Chief (the ministry was headed by Deputy Minister of Railways Minister Alexei Larionov).

Emigration, return, death
In 1920 Ustrugov emigrated to China. He and his family lived in Harbin, in 1924–1935 he was the second rector of the Harbin Polytechnic Institute, where Russian emigrants received an engineering education.

In 1935, at the invitation of the government, Ustrugov and his family returned to the Soviet Union together with the employees of the CER, who were also Soviet citizens. For some time he worked in the specialty of the People's Commissariat of Communications in Moscow.

On October 7, 1937, Ustrugov was arrested. On February 15, 1938, he was sentenced by the Military Collegium of the Supreme Court of the USSR to be shot on charges of espionage and participation in a counter-revolutionary organization. On the same day, he was shot and buried at the Kommunarka shooting ground. He was posthumously rehabilitated in May 1989 by the Plenum of the Supreme Court of the USSR.

Sources
Nikolai Dmitriev. Ministers-railwaymen // White army. White matter. Historical popular science almanac. Number 10. Ekaterinburg, 2002.

References

External links
Biography on hrono.ru
Vladimir Shishkin. On the history of the coup in Omsk (November 18–19, 1918) 
List of victims of political terror in the USSR on the Memorial Society website.

1877 births
1938 deaths
Recipients of the Order of St. Anna, 3rd class
Civil engineers from the Russian Empire
White Russian emigrants to China
Great Purge victims from Russia
People executed by the Soviet Union by firearm
Soviet rehabilitations